Ninfa Clara Salinas Sada (born 1 May 1980) is a Mexican politician. she is a marketing specialist from Universidad Anáhuac de México, she has an extensive political career being a current member of the Partido Verde Ecologista de México. In Mexican politics she is recognized as one of the youngest women in the country in holding a political position, and as an important figure who drives laws in benefit of the environment. Currently she holds the position of President at Grupo Dragón, a company that generates electricity from renewable energy.

Education
Salinas earned her bachelor’s degree in marketing from Universidad Anáhuac de México.

Masters in Sustainability and Administration of the Environment from Harvard University.

Political career
She was a Congresswoman in term LXI (2009-2012), being one of the youngest women to carry out that position. She led the Commission for the Environment and Natural Resources. She coordinated the approval of the Law to Use Renewable Energy which generated a 50% increase in the budget to trade 16, appointed to the environment. She also drove the Law for Financing of the Energy Transition, and the General Law for Climate Change which incorporates Mexico in an important group of countries with an effective legislation to fight and minimize the effects of climate change. 

During her time in the House of Representatives she centered her initiatives in protecting the environment, she was seeking to protect the forest industry in Mexico and joined the efforts from the legislators from different political parties in topics of human trafficking, security and labor. 

She was Senator of the Republic from the Partido Verde Ecologista de Mexico (PVEM) for terms LXII and LXIII (2012-2018). During both terms she led the Commission for the Environment and Natural Resources, and was a member the Energy, Hydraulic Resources and External Affairs in North America Commissions.

Professional Experience
Currently President of Grupo Dragón, a company that generates electricity from renewable energy. 
She acts as President for the Executive Council at Fundación Azteca in Grupo Salinas, which has been active for over 20 years and whose objective is drive education with a focus on freedom, innovation, and creativity in their educational and environmental programs. Currently promoting their educational model in 5 Planteles Azteca and will impact more than 10 thousand children in Mexico in the next 3 years. 
As part of Grupo Salinas, she is Vice president of the Executive Committee, as well as President of the Advisory Committees of the group, which are links to the main business leaders in the country, and currently group together more than 300 business owners from all over Mexico. 
She has carried out various positions in Grupo Salinas, such as Director of Energy and Sustainability, Director of Promoespacio and Director in i Latina.

References

External links
 Iniciativa con proyecto de Decreto por la que se Reforma el Artículo 73.
 Proyecto de decreto que reforma y adiciona diversas disposiciones de la Ley Orgánica de la Administración Pública Federal.

Living people
1980 births
21st-century Mexican politicians
21st-century Mexican women politicians
Ecologist Green Party of Mexico politicians
Members of the Chamber of Deputies (Mexico)
Members of the Senate of the Republic (Mexico)
Women members of the Chamber of Deputies (Mexico)
Women members of the Senate of the Republic (Mexico)
Politicians from Mexico City
Universidad Anáhuac México alumni
Harvard Extension School alumni